Hildebrandtia ornatissima is a species of frog in the family Ptychadenidae. It is endemic to Angola. Its natural habitats are dry savanna, moist savanna, intermittent freshwater lakes, and intermittent freshwater marshes.

References

ornatissima
Amphibians of Angola
Endemic fauna of Angola
Taxonomy articles created by Polbot
Amphibians described in 1879